Angiactis is a genus of crustose lichens of uncertain familial placement in the order Arthoniales. It has four species.

Taxonomy
The genus was circumscribed in 2008 by lichenologists André Aptroot and Laurens Sparrius, with Angiactis littoralis assigned as the type species. This lichen was originally described as a species of Lecanographa by Gintaras Kantvilas.

Description
Angiactis species have a thalline exciple (rim), but lack a cortex. Their asci are of the Grumulosa-type, and the ascospores are hyaline, with thick walls. The excipulum is carbonized (blackened) and does not have any reaction with a KOH solution.

Species
Angiactis banksiae 
Angiactis bermudensis  – Bermuda
Angiactis littoralis  – Australia
Angiactis spinicola  – Galápagos

References

Arthoniomycetes
Lichen genera
Arthoniomycetes genera
Taxa described in 2008
Taxa named by André Aptroot